Sicyopterus lengguru is a species of goby that is from Papua New Guinea.  This species can reach a length of  SL.

References

lengguru
Freshwater fish of Indonesia
Taxa named by Philippe Keith
Taxa named by Clara Lord
Taxa named by Renny Kurnia Hadiaty
Fish described in 2012